Harrison County Airport  is a public use airport located two nautical miles (4 km) south of the central business district of Cadiz, a village in Harrison County, Ohio, United States. It is owned by the Harrison County Airport Authority. This airport is included in the National Plan of Integrated Airport Systems for 2011–2015, which categorized it as a general aviation facility.

Facilities and aircraft 
Harrison County Airport covers an area of 8 acres (3 ha) at an elevation of 1,174 feet (358 m) above mean sea level. It has one runway designated 13/31 with an asphalt surface measuring 3,765 by 75 feet (1,148 x 23 m).

For the 12-month period ending August 30, 2010, the airport had 11,900 aircraft operations, an average of 32 per day: 96% general aviation, 3% air taxi, and <1% military. At that time there were 25 aircraft based at this airport: 92% single-engine, 4% glider, and 4% ultralight.

References

External links 
 Aerial image as of April 1994 from USGS The National Map
 

Airports in Ohio
Buildings and structures in Harrison County, Ohio
Transportation in Harrison County, Ohio